"Ever Since You Went Away" is a song by Art n' Soul. The song is the opening track from the band's debut album Touch of Soul and was issued as the album's first single. It was written by band members Sam Bostic and Rodney Lattrel Evans, along with Tony! Toni! Toné! drummer Timothy Christian Riley, who also produced the song. The song was the band's only song to chart on the Billboard Hot 100, peaking at #72 in 1996.

Music video

The official music video for the song was directed by Michael Lucero.

Chart positions

References

External links
 

Art n' Soul songs
Big Beat Records (American record label) singles
1996 debut singles
Music videos directed by Michael Lucero
1996 songs